Sergio Tedesco (23 April 1928 – 3 June 2012) was an Italian actor, voice actor and operatic tenor.

Biography
Tedesco was born in La Spezia. His father died when he was nine years old and he moved to Rome with his mother to help get a head start on his career. He eventually made his film debut in the 1941 film Il bazar delle idee directed by Marcello Albani. He acted in two other films that same year.

As the years passed, Tedesco showed a natural talent in singing. He performed as a tenor at the Rome Opera House a few times and has acted and sung in several plays and made collaborations with Mario Zafred, Tito Gobbi, Renato Capecchi and Carlo Maria Giulini. Tedesco also performed at the Carignano Theatre in Turin and La Fenice in Venice. In 1998, Tedesco officially retired from opera singing.

Tedesco was also a very successful voice dubber. He voiced Kaa in the Italian version of The Jungle Book and he even reprised the role in the 2003 sequel. He also dubbed Avery Bullock in the Italian dub of American Dad and Sam the Eagle and Statler in The Muppets from 1979 to 1999.

Personal life
Tedesco had two children. His daughter Paola Tedesco is an actress and his son Maurizio Tedesco is a film producer.

Death
Tedesco died on 3 June 2012 at the age of 84. He spent the last 17 years of his life in Perugia, where he died.

Filmography

Cinema
Il bazar delle idee (1941)
La forza bruta (1941)
Amore imperiale (1941)
The White Angel (1955)
Piluk, the Timid One (1968)
Fuga dal Paradiso (1989)
The House of Chicken (2001)

Dubbing roles

Animation
Avery Bullock in American Dad! (seasons 1-7)
Kaa in The Jungle Book
Kaa in The Jungle Book 2
Sir Hiss in Robin Hood
Prince Phillip in Sleeping Beauty
Sam the Eagle / Statler in The Muppet Movie
Sam the Eagle in The Great Muppet Caper
Sam the Eagle (Headmaster) / Statler (Jacob Marley) in The Muppet Christmas Carol
Sam the Eagle (Samuel Arrow) / Statler in Muppet Treasure Island
Sam the Eagle in Muppets from Space
Television Announcer in One Hundred and One Dalmatians
Jaq in Cinderella
Corn Pone in Hey There, It's Yogi Bear!
Gopher in Winnie the Pooh and the Honey Tree
Cotton Hill in King of the Hill (seasons 1-8)
Angus MacBadger / Sleepy Hollow Narrator in The Adventures of Ichabod and Mr. Toad

Live action
Richard Rich in A Man for All Seasons
Wackford Squeers in Nicholas Nickleby
King William IV in The Young Victoria
I. Y. Yunioshi in Breakfast at Tiffany's
Ebenezer Scrooge in Scrooge
George Dunlap in Shoot the Moon
Danny in Night Must Fall
Peter Thorndyke in The Love Bug
Frank Burns in M*A*S*H
Mr. Strickland in Back to the Future Part II
Dodge in Planet of the Apes
Serge Shubin in Mata Hari (1983 redub)
Clyde Bowren in The Dirty Dozen
General Orlov in Octopussy
Auguste Balls in Trail of the Pink Panther
Marcus Brody in Indiana Jones and the Last Crusade
Edwin Flagg in What Ever Happened to Baby Jane?
Rufus S. Bratton in Tora! Tora! Tora!
Ángel Calderón de la Barca y Belgrano in Amistad
Sir Cuthbert Ware-Armitage in Monte Carlo or Bust!

References

External links
 
 
 
 
 

1928 births
2012 deaths
People from La Spezia
Italian male film actors
Italian male voice actors
Italian male stage actors
Italian male child actors
Italian male radio actors
Italian operatic tenors
20th-century Italian male actors
21st-century Italian male actors
20th-century Italian male opera singers
Disease-related deaths in Umbria